1,2-Dimethylethylenediamine (DMEDA) is the organic compound with the formula (CHNH)CH.  It is a colorless liquid with a fishy odor.  It features two secondary amine functional groups.

Reactions
DMEDA is used as a chelating diamine for the preparation of metal complexes, some of which function as homogeneous catalysts.

The compound is used as a precursor to imidazolidines by condensation with ketones or with aldehydes:
RR'CO + CH(CHNH) → CH(CHN)CRR' + HO

See also
 1,1-Dimethylethylenediamine
 Dimethylaminopropylamine

References

Diamines
Chelating agents